St. Ann's Church Complex is now a historic cultural center in Woonsocket, Rhode Island on Cumberland Street. It was formerly a Roman Catholic church within the Diocese of Providence.

Description
The Renaissance style church was built in 1913 by Walter F. Fontaine to serve Woonsocket's French-Canadian community. The complex originally encompassed a church, school, convent, parish house and a gymnasium that doubled as a theater.

The church closed in October 2000 and later reopened as the St. Ann Arts and Cultural Center. The St. Ann's complex was added to the National Register of Historic Places in 1982.

See also
 Catholic Church in the United States
 Catholic parish church
 Index of Catholic Church articles
 National Register of Historic Places listings in Providence County, Rhode Island
 Pastoral care

References

External links
St Ann Arts and Cultural Center

French-Canadian culture in Rhode Island
Roman Catholic churches completed in 1913
20th-century Roman Catholic church buildings in the United States
Churches in the Roman Catholic Diocese of Providence
Churches on the National Register of Historic Places in Rhode Island
Historic American Buildings Survey in Rhode Island
Buildings and structures in Woonsocket, Rhode Island
Churches in Providence County, Rhode Island
1913 establishments in Rhode Island
Roman Catholic churches in Rhode Island
National Register of Historic Places in Providence County, Rhode Island